The 2021 Multishow Brazilian Music Award, the 28th edition of the Multishow Brazilian Music Award, was held on 8 December 2021, broadcast live on the Multishow channel. The ceremony was presented by singer Iza and presenter Tatá Werneck in Rio de Janeiro.

In this edition, eight categories were opened for public voting before the event date. However, on 7 November, it was announced that the "Best Female Singer" category would have its voting canceled and the victory would be given to Marília Mendonça, who died two days earlier in a plane crash in Piedade de Caratinga, Minas Gerais.

Winners and nominees

Notes and references 
Notes:

References:

2021 in Latin music
2021 music awards
December 2021 events in Brazil